Antipterna assulosa is a species of moth in the family Oecophoridae, first described by Alfred Jefferis Turner in 1940 as Machaeretis assulosa. The species epithet, assulosa, derives from the Latin adjective, assulosus ("like a splinter").  The holotype for Machaeretis assulosa was collected at Sandgate in Queensland.

Further reading

References

Oecophorinae
Taxa described in 1940
Taxa named by Alfred Jefferis Turner